Heath Springs Depot, also known as the Southern Railway Depot, is a historic train station located at Heath Springs, Lancaster County, South Carolina. It was built in 1903, by the Southern Railway. It was the third depot built at Heath Springs.  It is a one-story frame building on a brick pier foundation and covered with shiplap siding.

It was added to the National Register of Historic Places in 1990.

References

Railway stations on the National Register of Historic Places in South Carolina
Railway stations in the United States opened in 1903
Buildings and structures in Lancaster County, South Carolina
National Register of Historic Places in Lancaster County, South Carolina
Stations along Southern Railway lines in the United States